West Logan is a census-designated place in Hocking County, Ohio. The population was 912 at the 2020 census. The community is located on the Hocking River between the city limits of Logan and U.S. Route 33.

History 
West Logan was historically home to Falls Mill, a mill built in 1815 by former Ohio governor Thomas Worthington. Falls Mill Bridge, connecting West Logan to the city of Logan through Ohio State Route 664, was named after the mill.

West Logan formerly housed an alternative elementary school in the Logan-Hocking School District.

Geography 

According to the United States Census Bureau, the CDP has a total area of 0.36 square miles (0.93 km2), of which 0.35 square miles (0.91 km2) is land and 0.01 square miles (0.02 km2) is water.

Demographics

References 

Census-designated places in Hocking County, Ohio